Josephine Ortleb (born 25 November 1986) is a German politician of the Social Democratic Party (SPD) who has been serving as a member of the Bundestag from the state of Saarland since 2017.

Political career 
Ortlieb became a member of the Bundestag in the 2017 German federal election, representing Saarbrücken. In parliament, she is a member of the Committee on Families, Senior Citizens, Women and Youth and the Committee on Human Rights and Humanitarian Aid. In this capacity, she serves as her parliamentary group’s rapporteur on gender equality. 

In addition to her committee assignments, Ortleb has been a substitute member of the German delegation to the Parliamentary Assembly of the Council of Europe (PACE) since 2018, where she serves on the Committee on Equality and Non-Discrimination (since 2018) and the Sub-Committee on the Rights of Minorities (since 2020).

Since 2020, Ortleb has been part of the SPD parliamentary group’s leadership under its chairman Rolf Mützenich. Within the group, she belongs to the Parliamentary Left, a left-wing movement.

Other activities 
 German Foundation for World Population (DSW), Member of the Parliamentary Advisory Board (2020–2021)
 Food, Beverages and Catering Union (NGG), Member

References

External links 

  
 Bundestag biography 

1986 births
Living people
Members of the Bundestag for Saarland
Female members of the Bundestag
21st-century German women politicians
Members of the Bundestag 2021–2025
Members of the Bundestag 2017–2021
Members of the Bundestag for the Social Democratic Party of Germany